Podocarpus nakaii is a species of conifer in the family Podocarpaceae. It is endemic to Taiwan, scattered in broad-leaf forests in the central part of this island. Ponesterone, which is similar to insect's moulting hormone ecdysone, is obtained from this plant. It was the first ecdysone isolated by Nkanishi et al.

According to the survey results of the sample area, there are about 100 Podocarpus nakaii per hectare. The diameter at breast height of the largest plant is about 30 cm, but nearly 90% of the trees have a diameter at breast height of less than 10 cm; the height of the trees is less than 10 meters. These characteristics show that the Podocarpus nakaii is a shade-tolerant species in the lower layer of the forest. The young seedlings are protected by the big trees and can grow well under the shade of the big trees.

Podocarpus nakaii is a good garden plant because of its beautiful tree shape and lovely bright red receptacles. In addition, according to scholars’ chemical analysis and related activity tests, its bark is considered to have anti-cancer potential.

References

nakaii
Endangered plants
Endemic flora of Taiwan
Taxonomy articles created by Polbot
Plants described in 1916